The 1881–82 season was Morton Football Club's fifth season in which they competed at a national level, entering the Scottish Cup.

Fixtures and results

Scottish Cup

Renfrewshire Cup

Greenock & District Charity Cup

Friendlies

References

External links
Greenock Morton FC official site

Greenock Morton F.C. seasons
Morton